Kumali, installed 2006, is a Vekoma Suspended Looping Coaster (SLC), located in Flamingo Land Resort in North Yorkshire, England. The ride is an Shenlin model layout and has four inversions, including the cobra roll which overlooks a lake. It is named after the alpha male of the zoo's lion pride. In 2008 Flamingo Land added video recorders to each car so riders can purchase their own video of them on the ride as well as the on-ride photo. The themed Kumali ride music was written and produced by ElectricStreetPolice, a British TV composer by the name of Paul Bickerdike who has credits on TV and in film at Cannes. Kumali is currently only one of three operating Vekoma SLCs in the UK. The Odyssey at Fantasy Island Ingoldmells, Skegness, is the largest, and the other, Infusion at Blackpool Pleasure Beach, is the smallest.

Layout
Kumali is the second of two "Shenlin" SLC installations from Vekoma, the first opened four years earlier at Happy Valley Shenzhen. The layout has since been reproduced by Chinese manufacturers.

The train first ascends a 117 ft chain lift hill and drops 111 ft to the right. The train then immediately enters the first inversion, a right vertical loop, before slightly banking right then straight again. The train then traverses the next two inversions, a left cobra roll, followed immediately by the last inversion, a zero g roll. A 360-degree right helix then brings the train into the brake run before turning right into another brake run and finally turns right into the station ready to unload/load again. In total, it has 4 inversions.

Incidents
Kumali has been known for sometimes breaking down on the lift hill leaving people stranded.

External links
 Kumali on Coasterpedia
A review of Kumali

References 

Tourist attractions in North Yorkshire
Roller coasters introduced in 2006
Roller coasters in the United Kingdom